Molecular/Genomic reference standards are a class of ‘controls’ or standards used to check the performance of molecular diagnostic assays. Molecular/Genomic Reference Materials (RMs) are selected or engineered to model a specific genetic biomarker as it occurs in a patient biopsy. Reference materials (RM) are used for a calibration of the measuring system, for assessment of a measurement procedure, for assigning values to materials, or for quality control.

Molecular reference materials

Molecular reference standards are available in a variety of formats, each of which has strengths and weaknesses. These materials range from synthetic DNA oligonucleotides or patient-derived genomic DNA, to actual patient tissue biopsies with known mutation status.

Proficiency schemes

Proficiency schemes involve the distribution of blinded reference materials to subscription laboratories, and the subsequent scoring and assessment of the proficiency of those labs in their molecular diagnostic testing.

Proficiency schemes are usually organized by not-for-profit organizations, usually government affiliated, to which hundreds of laboratories may subscribe. These schemes are funded with the subscription fees paid by each member laboratory.

Proficiency schemes have historically relied upon patient biopsies with known mutation status for distribution to member laboratories. However, due to the significant rise in the number of labs performing molecular testing (in turn caused by the increase in the number of available targeted drugs whose prescription is linked to the presence or absence of a particular biomarker), patient samples are becoming an unsustainable source of reference material. Increasingly, proficiency scheme organizers are turning to genetically modified cell lines as a sustainable and well defined source of reference material.

Some of the largest proficiency scheme organizers in the world include:
 College of American Pathologists (CAP) – USA
 European Molecular Quality Network (EMQN) – UK, Europe, EMEA
 United Kingdom National External Quality Assessment Scheme (NEQAS) – UK, Europe, EMEA

Sources

Sources of Certified Reference Materials (CRM) include:
 Institute for Reference Materials and Measurements
 NIBSC
 NIST
 Horizon Discovery Reference Standards
 Maine Molecular Quality Controls
 Molecular Controls/ Seracare Life Sciences
 World Health Organization - International Reference Materials

More Information can be found on the CDC and Eurogentest webpages.

Cell Line Repositories
 American Type Culture Collection (ATCC)
 Coriell Cell Repositories
 German Collection of Microorganisms and Cell Cultures
 Health Protection Agency Culture Collections
 Japanese Collection of Research Bioresources
 Riken Bioresource Center

Medical tests